Kevin D. Bratcher (born April 17, 1961, in Louisville, Kentucky) is an American politician and a Republican member of the Kentucky House of Representatives representing District 29 since January 1997. He was the first Republican House Majority Whip in Kentucky history (the position wasn't created until 1933). Currently, Bratcher is the Chairman of the House Elections, Constitutional Amendments and Intergovernmental Affairs Committee.

Kevin's cousin, Steve Bratcher, is also a member of the Kentucky House of Representatives from District 25.

Education
Bratcher earned his BS from Embry–Riddle Aeronautical University, his MA in media communications from Webster University and his AAS in Mechanical Engineering Technology from the Louisville Technical Institute.

Elections
1996 Bratcher won the November 5, 1996 General election against Democratic nominee John Flood.
1998 Bratcher won the November 3, 1998 General election against Democratic nominee Joyce McClain.
2000 Bratcher and returning 1998 Democratic challenger Joyce McClain, setting up a rematch; Bratcher won the November 7, 2000 General election with 8,915 votes (57.3%) against McClain.
2002 Bratcher won both the 2002 Republican Primary and the November 5, 2002 General election, winning with 12,008 votes.
2004 Bratcher was challenged in the 2004 Republican Primary, winning with (74.1%) and won the November 2, 2004 General election with 15,407 votes (62.8%) against Democratic nominee Bruce Roberts.
2006 Bratcher won the 2006 Republican Primary and the November 7, 2006 General election, winning with 13,411 votes.
2008 Bratcher ran for the 2008 Republican Primary and won the November 4, 2008 General election with 16,630 votes (58.8%) against Democratic nominee James Sexton, who had been his Republican Primary challenger in 2004. Bratcher also won the November 2, 2010 General election with  15,019 votes (68.3%) against Democratic nominee Dustin Wilcher.
2012 Bratcher won the May 22, 2012 Republican Primary and the November 6, 2012 General election with 21,143 votes.
2014 Bratcher defeated Democratic challenger Dave Stengel for the November 4, 2014 General election. 
2018 Bratcher defeated Democratic challenger Ronel Brown for the November 6, 2018 General election. Bratcher 10,570 Brown 9,251. 
2020 Bratcher defeated Democratic challenger Suzanne Kugler in the November 3, 2020 General election. Bratcher 15,298 (55.6%)  Kugler 12,201 (44.4%)

Committee Assignments 

 General Government
 Elections, Const. Amendments & Intergovernmental Affairs (Chair)
 Judiciary
 Licensing, Occupations, & Administrative Regulations
 State Government

References

External links
Official page at the Kentucky General Assembly
Campaign site

Kevin Bratcher at Ballotpedia
Kevin D. Bratcher at the National Institute on Money in State Politics

1961 births
Living people
Embry–Riddle Aeronautical University alumni
Republican Party members of the Kentucky House of Representatives
Politicians from Louisville, Kentucky
United States Navy sailors
Webster University alumni
21st-century American politicians